Tom Duponchelle (born 17 February 1996) is a French professional footballer who plays as a defender for  club Le Puy.

Career
Duponchelle made his professional debut with Le Mans in a 2–1 Ligue 2 loss to Lens on 27 July 2019.

On 12 June 2022, Duponchelle signed a pre-contract agreement with Championnat National side Le Puy.

References

External links
 
 
 Football Database Profile

1996 births
Living people
Sportspeople from Amiens
Association football defenders
French footballers
Amiens SC players
Stade de Reims players
Le Mans FC players
Stade Lavallois players
Hyères FC players
Le Puy Foot 43 Auvergne players
Championnat National 3 players
Championnat National 2 players
Championnat National players
Ligue 2 players
Footballers from Hauts-de-France